Lohikoski is a district of Jyväskylä, Finland and a part of the Lohikoski-Seppälänkangas ward. Lahjaharju, Holsti, Kyyhkysenmäki and Paloniemi are subareas of Lohikoski. The district has several services such as a school, a library and a convenience store. Also the Seppälä fire station and the Lahjaharju graveyard are located in the area.

Gallery

References 

Neighbourhoods of Jyväskylä